Sayyar (Arabic: سیار) is an Arabic word which is used as a surname and a given name. People with the name include:

Surname
 Ahmed Sayyar (born 1993), Qatari football player
 Ali Sayyar (1926–2019), Bahraini journalist and politician
 Mohammed Sayyar (born 1991), Qatari football player

Father name
 Nasr ibn Sayyar (663–748), Arab general and governor
 Ibn Sayyar al-Warraq, 10th-century Arab writer

Given name
 Sayyar Jamil, Iraqi academic

See also
 Sayyar Ahmadabad-e Movali, village in Iran

Arabic-language surnames
Arabic given names